Ginger Ale Afternoon is a 1989 independent film by director Rafal Zielinski, based on a stage play by Gina Wendkos.

Plot summary

A man and his pregnant wife, played by Dana Andersen, live in a trailer park. The wife discovers that the husband has been spending time with their young neighbor. The young neighbor is played by Yeardley Smith, who is best known as the voice of Lisa Simpson.

Cast

  Dana Andersen as Jesse Mickers 
 John M. Jackson	as Hank Mickers 
 Yeardley Smith	as Bonnie Cleator

Awards

The soundtrack, by Willie Dixon, was nominated for a Grammy.

References

The film was nominated for the Grand Jury Prize at the 1989 Sundance Film Festival.
https://www.imdb.com/title/tt0097432/awards?ref_=tt_awd

Cultural references

The 1992 album Hit to Death in the Future Head by American alternative rock band The Flaming Lips includes a song called Gingerale Afternoon (The Astrology of a Saturday).

 

1989 films
American films based on plays
American independent films
Films directed by Rafal Zielinski
1980s English-language films
1980s American films